The following table indicates the party of elected officials in the U.S. state of Colorado:
Governor
Lieutenant Governor
Secretary of State
Attorney General
State Treasurer

The table also indicates the historical party composition in the:
State Senate
State House of Representatives
State delegation to the U.S. Senate
State delegation to the U.S. House of Representatives

For years in which a presidential election was held, the table indicates which party's nominees received the state's electoral votes.

Pre-statehood (1861–1875)

1876–present

See also
 Elections in Colorado
Politics of Colorado
 Colorado Democratic Party
 Colorado Republican Party
Government of Colorado

References

Further reading
 Martin, Curtis. “The 1962 Election in Colorado.” The Western Political Quarterly, vol. 16, no. 2, 1963, pp. 421–425.

Politics of Colorado
Government of Colorado
Colorado